The 1958 Syracuse Orangemen football team represented Syracuse University during the 1958 NCAA University Division football season. The Orangemen were led by 10th-year head coach Ben Schwartzwalder and played their home games at Archbold Stadium in Syracuse, New York. Syracuse finished the regular season ranked in the top 10 of both major polls after compiling a record of 8–1. They were invited to the 1959 Orange Bowl, where they were defeated by Oklahoma.

Schedule

Note: The game against Boston University was played at night.

Game summaries

West Virginia

References

Syracuse
Syracuse Orange football seasons
Syracuse Orangemen football